Mike Bryan and Jack Sock won their second consecutive Grand Slam as a pair, defeating Łukasz Kubot and Marcelo Melo in the final, 6–3, 6–1. Mike Bryan won an all-time record 18th grand slam men's doubles title, and with a 6th US Open men's doubles title, he equals Richard Sears and Holcombe Ward.

Bryan retained the ATP number 1 doubles ranking at the conclusion of this tournament, after fellow contenders Oliver Marach and John Peers both lost in the early rounds. Sock reached a career-high ranking of no. 2 after this tournament.

Jean-Julien Rojer and Horia Tecău were the defending champions, but lost in the second round to Radu Albot and Malek Jaziri. Albot and Jaziri became the first Moldovan and Tunisian respectively to reach the semifinals at a Grand Slam.

Seeds

Draw

Finals

Top half

Section 1

Section 2

Bottom half

Section 3

Section 4

References

External links
Main draw
2018 US Open – Men's draws and results at the International Tennis Federation

Men's Doubles
US Open – Men's Doubles
US Open (tennis) by year – Men's doubles